Garry Andrew Haylock (born 31 December 1970) is an English former footballer who is currently manager of Binfield.

Playing career
Born in Bradford, Haylock played for Huddersfield Town, Shelbourne, Linfield, Portadown, Panionios, Glenavon, Glentoran, Dundalk, Ards and Shamrock Rovers.

He made his League of Ireland debut on 14 January 1990, on loan from Huddersfield, and in his second game scored a hat trick.

In 1999 playing for Panionios under Ronnie Whelan he was part of the team that reached the quarter-final of the UEFA Cup Winners' Cup.

He made 30 appearances in European competition for Irish clubs, scoring in the European Champion Clubs' Cup twice. He made a scoring debut at Glentoran, Dundalk and Rovers. He never started a game for Shamrock Rovers but scored twice from 6 substitute appearances.

He scored the two goals for Dundalk F.C. in their FAI Cup triumph in 2002. This was his fifth Cup medal in Ireland.

Managerial career
Haylock was appointed as the first manager of Hayes & Yeading United in May 2007, having previously held the post with Yeading FC from December 2006. He received the Manager of the Month Award from the Conference South for September 2008 when his team topped the Division, and again for March 2009 after another winning run as he led the club to the league play-offs and promotion to the Conference National.

Haylock resigned from his post as manager of Hayes & Yeading United on 30 May 2011. A week later Farnborough unveiled Haylock and Gareth Hall as the new management team. Just five months later Haylock and his assistant were relieved of their duties at Farnborough after a string of poor performances, including an 8–2 hammering at the hands of Truro City.

He was appointed manager at Bedfont Town on 6 January 2012  but left the club in May 2012, standing down from his roles of manager and acting chairman.

Garry then had a spell as first team coach & analyst at League Two side Exeter City, before accepting the opportunity to return to manage Hayes & Yeading United in October 2015. He left Hayes & Yeading again in April 2016. In April 2017 he was appointed manager of Bedfont & Feltham. He left the club in October the same year.

On 27 September 2022, he was announced as manager of Binfield FC

References

1970 births
Living people
English footballers
Association football forwards
Huddersfield Town A.F.C. players
Shelbourne F.C. players
Linfield F.C. players
Portadown F.C. players
Panionios F.C. players
Glenavon F.C. players
Glentoran F.C. players
Dundalk F.C. players
Ards F.C. players
Shamrock Rovers F.C. players
Basingstoke Town F.C. players
Sutton United F.C. players
Team Bath F.C. players
Walton & Hersham F.C. players
Cove F.C. players
Yeading F.C. players
English Football League players
League of Ireland players
NIFL Premiership players
English football managers
National League (English football) managers
Yeading F.C. managers
Hayes & Yeading United F.C. managers
Footballers from Bradford
Farnborough F.C. managers
Bedfont Town F.C. managers
Bedfont & Feltham F.C. managers
Binfield F.C. managers